Castel Savelli (also Castel Savello) was a castle near Albano Laziale, in the Lazio region of central Italy. The Savelli family had owned the estate since the 1160s, and build the castle during the papal reign of Pope Honorius III (1216–1227) and Pope Honorius IV (1285–1287). The castle was razed by the forces of cardinal Giovanni Vitelleschi in 1435, and never rebuilt.

References 

Buildings and structures in Albano Laziale
Castles in Lazio
Savelli family